The Mike Coolbaugh Award is presented annually by Minor League Baseball to recognize "an individual who has shown an outstanding baseball work ethic, knowledge of the game, and skill in mentoring young players on the field." It is usually awarded during baseball's Winter Meetings. The award, first issued in 2008, is named in honor of Mike Coolbaugh, who died when he was struck by a line drive while coaching at first base during a Tulsa Drillers game in July 2007.

Two personnel from the Nashville Sounds have won the Mike Coolbaugh Award, more than any other team. Two members of the Cleveland Guardians and Milwaukee Brewers Major League Baseball (MLB) organizations have each won the award, more than any others.

Winners

References
Specific

General

Awards established in 2008
Minor league baseball trophies and awards
Minor league baseball personnel